Jeffrey Lynn Bennetzen is an American geneticist on the faculty of the University of Georgia (UGA). Bennetzen is known for his work describing codon usage bias in yeast, being the first to clone and sequence an active transposon in maize, and developing and proposing along with Michael Freeling the model of the grasses as a single genetic system. He is one of two authors, with Sarah Hake of the book "Handbook of Maize." Bennetzen was elected to the National Academy of Sciences in 2004.

Education 

After his 1970 graduation from Upland High School in Upland, California, he received his bachelor's degree in biology from the University of California, San Diego in 1974 and his doctoral degree in biochemistry from the University of Washington in 1980. He served as a postdoctoral fellow from 1980 through 1981 on a joint project between Washington University in St. Louis, Stanford University and the University of California, Berkeley. From 1981 to 1983 he was a research scientist at the International Plant Research Institute.

Career 

In 1983, Bennetzen became an Assistant Professor at Purdue University, becoming a full Professor in 1991 and H. Edwin Umbarger Distinguished Professor of Genetics in 1999. After two decades at Purdue, he joined the faculty at UGA in 2003 as a Professor of Genetics, Georgia Research Alliance Eminent Scholar, and Giles Chair in Molecular Biology and Functional Genomics. He was interim Head of the Department of Genetics at UGA from 2009–2011. He is also an adjunct member of UGA's interdisciplinary Institute of Bioinformatics and Department of Plant Biology. He founded the Maize Genetics Executive Committee (2000) and the McClintock Prize (2014). From 2012–2016, he was a 1000 Talents Professor in the Chinese Academy of Sciences at the Kunming Institute of Botany. In 2016, he established labs at Anhui Agricultural University and the Yunnan Academy of Forestry to study the molecular genetics of tea (Camellia sinensis) and two Chinese native oil trees, Camellia oleifera and Malania oleifera.

Research Focuses 

Bennetzen's research interests include plant genome structure/evolution and gene function relationships, transposable element (TE) biology, genetic diversity in under-utilized crops of the developing world, rapid evolution of complex disease resistance loci in plants, fine structure recombinational analysis, the coevolution of plant/microbe and plant/parasite interactions, and the genetic basis of quality traits in tea and other important crops. His lab was the first to clone an active TE from plants (1982); to show that classic disease resistance genes in plants are both recombinationally unstable and cell autonomous (1988); to use DNA probes from one grass genome to map another (maize, sorghum), demonstrating genetic collinearity (1990); to show that DNA TEs preferentially insert into hypomethylated DNAs in or near genes (1995); to demonstrate that the majority of plant genomes is composed of LTR retrotransposons (1996); to show the microcolinearity of plant genomes (1997), and the nature/rate/origin of exceptions to microcolinearity (1999); to explain the timing and mode of both plant genome expansion (1998) and contraction (2002); to show that plant centromeres are hot spots for recombination but not crossing over (2006); to show apparent site-directed recombination in plants (at a disease resistance gene) (2008); to use centromere gain/loss to determine the origin of plant chromosomes (in maize) (2012); to demonstrate that errors in mismatch base repair may be the most common origin of DNA double strand breaks in plants (2014); and to demonstrate domestication-associated changes in root and rhizosphere microbiomes (2018).

Education and honors
  Bachelor of Arts, Biology, Highest Honors, University of California, San Diego, 1974 
  Ph.D., Biochemistry, University of Washington, 1980 
  Presidential Young Investigator Award, National Science Foundation, 1986
  McKnight Foundation Award in Plant Biology, 1986
  Fulbright Awards, 1990 & 2008 
  Sigma Xi Faculty Research Award, Purdue University, 1995
  Umbarger Endowed Professorship in Genetics, 1999 
  Pandit Jawaharlal Nehru Centenary Professorship, University of Hyderabad, 2002 
  Member, National Academy of Sciences, 2004 
  Guggenheim Fellowship, 2008
  1000 Overseas Talents Award, Chinese Academy of Sciences, 2012
  Lamar Dodd Creative Research Medal, University of Georgia, 2014
  Yunnan Province Overseas Talent Award, 2015
  Dist. Visiting Researcher Award, CSIRO, Australia, 2017

References

UGA Genetics Department Biography
UGA professor Jeffrey Bennetzen named to National Academy of Sciences, Scienceblog.com, April 2004
Bennetzen Research Group website

Living people
Members of the United States National Academy of Sciences
American geneticists
University of Georgia faculty
University of Washington alumni
Year of birth missing (living people)
University of California, San Diego alumni
Washington University in St. Louis fellows
Purdue University faculty